Barons is a village in southern Alberta, Canada in a region referred to as Palliser's Triangle. Barons was a filming location for a scene in the 1978 film Superman; the village's school was used to represent the school that young Clark Kent (the future Superman) attended.

History 
The Canadian Pacific Railway purchased the present townsite of Barons in early 1909. Charles S. Noble, an agent for the CPR sold lots to settlers. The train station was originally named "Baron", but public usage eventually evolved to "Barons".

Barons became a village on May 6, 1910, and early buildings included a hardware store, a grocery store, lumber yards, a bank, a feedmill, a dance hall, an opera house and a hotel.

The Village of Barons was subject to a study in 2004 that investigated dissolution of the village to hamlet status under the jurisdiction of the County of Lethbridge.

The last two grain elevators were demolished in the summer of 2012.

Demographics 

Government 
The village is governed by a council comprising a mayor and two councillors.

Infrastructure 

Water is supplied via a  regional pipeline between Barons and the Village of Nobleford. The pipeline is a joint venture between Nobleford, Barons and the County of Lethbridge (NBC) in partnership with the Province of Alberta through its "Water for Life" program.

Services 
High speed wireless Internet access is available from multiple providers.

See also 
List of communities in Alberta
List of villages in Alberta

References

External links 

1910 establishments in Alberta
Lethbridge County
Villages in Alberta